RV Hero was a research vessel that operated in Antarctica for the National Science Foundation between 1968 and 1984, after which she was laid up until she sank in 2017.

Career

Hero, named after the sloop that Nathaniel Palmer sailed when he sighted Antarctica, was launched in 1968 by the shipyard of Harvey F. Gamage in South Bristol, Maine. Made from native-oak timbers, Oregon fir, and also tropical greenheart from Guyana, South America.

She arrived in Antarctica at Palmer Station for the first time in December, and as part of the U.S. Antarctic Research Program, for the next sixteen years, she transported scientists around the continent to perform research. She was the first vessel to be dedicated full time to scientists at Palmer Station, allowing them access to areas further afield they had been previously unable to access reliably.

Pieter J. Lenie (1923-2015), was the (Belgian born) American captain during the Antarctic time.

After the 1984 research season, she was decommissioned, and then Hero was acquired by the Port of Umpqua for $5,000 and the non-profit International Oceanographic Hero Foundation was formed by local residents with the intention to restore Hero into a museum ship.  The foundation ran short of money and members, and was unable to find funding to pay for either restoration or maintenance of the vessel, and was dissolved in 1997.  After an unsuccessful effort by former Hero crewmember John Morrison to purchase and restore the vessel, she was sold at auction to local fisherman Bill Wechter in 2000, who was able to move Hero to drydock for some restoration, and later moved her to Newport, Oregon. In 2008 she was sold to another local named  Sun Feather LightDancer, who moved her to Bay Center, Washington, and intended to restore her but was unable to obtain the required financing.  On March 4, 2017, Hero sank at her dock in Bay Center.

Design
Hero was designed by Potter and M'Arthur, Inc., of Boston, Massachusetts as a shallow draft vessel to enter coastal waters that larger vessels then in service were unable to reach. A type SV-BP.  She had a two deck wooden oak hull, sheathed with greenheart for icebreaking, and a small superstructure.  For scientific work, she was outfitted with several laboratories, as well as accommodation for on board scientists in addition to her normal crew.  While primarily powered by a pair of diesel engines, she was rigged as a ketch in order to increase stability and allow for silent running, both desirable for some scientific work.  She was also equipped with several winches and a work boat to support underwater research.

External links
A True "Hero": History of a Maine-Built Research Vessel at YouTube, Presented by Charles H. Lagerbom, hosted by the Camden, ME Public Library

References

Ships built in South Bristol, Maine
1968 ships
Research vessels of the National Science Foundation
Maritime incidents in 2017
Research vessels of the United States